Velika Braina is a village located in the municipality of Medveđa, Serbia. According to the 2011 census, the village has a population of 28 inhabitants.

Demographics

References

Populated places in Jablanica District